St. George's Church is an Anglican church in Sydney, Nova Scotia. It is the oldest building in Sydney and the oldest Anglican church in Cape Breton. The church was built by the 33rd Regiment of Foot. It was designated a Nova Scotian heritage property on April 4, 1984.

The Queen Mother attended a service at St. George's in 1967.

References 

Heritage sites in Nova Scotia
Buildings and structures in the Cape Breton Regional Municipality
Anglican church buildings in Nova Scotia
18th-century Anglican church buildings in Canada